Clear Lake Township is one of twelve townships in Steuben County, Indiana, United States. As of the 2010 census, its population was 799 and it contained 928 housing units. It is the north easternmost township in the state.

History
William L. Lords House was listed on the National Register of Historic Places in 1983.

Geography
Lakes in this township include Clear Lake, Handy Lake, Lake Anne, Long Lake, Mirror Lake, Mud Lake, and Round Lake.

Cities and towns
 Clear Lake

Cemeteries
The township contains three cemeteries: Teeters, Clear Lake Baptist, and Clear Lake Lutheran.

Major highways
  Indiana State Road 120

Education
Clear Lake Township residents may obtain a free library card from the Fremont Public Library.

References
 
"Steuben County Cemeteries", Steuben County, Indiana, INGenWeb Site, accessed August 12, 2008.
 United States Census Bureau cartographic boundary files

External links
 Indiana Township Association
 United Township Association of Indiana

Townships in Steuben County, Indiana
Townships in Indiana